The 1955 National Invitation Tournament was the 1955 edition of the annual NCAA college basketball competition.

Selected teams
Below is a list of the 12 teams selected for the tournament.

 Cincinnati
 Connecticut
 Dayton
 Duquesne
 Holy Cross
 Lafayette
 Louisville
 Manhattan
 Niagara
 Saint Francis (PA)
 Saint Louis
 Seton Hall

Bracket
Below is the tournament bracket.

See also
 1955 NCAA basketball tournament
 1955 NAIA Basketball Tournament

References

National Invitation
National Invitation Tournament
1950s in Manhattan
Basketball in New York City
College sports in New York City
Madison Square Garden
National Invitation Tournament
National Invitation Tournament
Sports competitions in New York City
Sports in Manhattan